The New Hebrides Trench is an oceanic trench which extends to over  deep in the Southern Pacific Ocean. It lies to the northeast of New Caledonia and the Loyalty Islands, to the southwest of Vanuatu, east of Australia, and south of Papua New Guinea and the Solomon Islands. The trench was formed as a result of the subduction zone. The Australian Plate is being subducted under the New Hebrides Plate causing volcanism which produced the Vanuatu archipelago.

The trench was first explored in 2013 by the University of Aberdeen's Oceanlab team. They found cusk-eels, prawns, and other eels, and crustaceans. This is significantly different from other deep sea trenches that have been studied.

Tectonics 
At the New Hebrides Trench, the Australian plate is being subducted underneath the New Hebrides microplate. The convergence rate ranges from /yr in the south, to /yr in the central section, to /yr in the north. The anomalous lack of convergence in the central section is caused by the subduction of the d'Entrecasteaux Ridge.

Associated seismicity
Major earthquakes associated with the subduction zone:

References 

Geology of New Caledonia
Geology of the Pacific Ocean
Loyalty Islands
Oceanic trenches of the Pacific Ocean
Subduction zones